The Unbroken Spirit, is a 2019 Malawian romantic drama film directed by Imran Kingsly Shaban and produced by Imran Pitersen Kaisi. The film stars Ken Kananji and Bertha Nkhoma in lead roles whereas Abdullah and Kamlanje Fantasia Mkwamba made supportive roles. The film was shot in the Malawi Mangochi District at Che Moto Village. 

The film received critics acclaim and screened worldwide. In 2019, the film was nominated for the Southern African Filmmaking competition of the Sotambe Documentary and Arts Film Festival in Zambia. In the same year, the film was screened at the Bayelsa International Film Festival, Nigeria. It is also the third Malawian film ever to be nominated for the Best Movie –Southern Africa category at the 2020 Africa Magic Viewers' Choice Awards (AMCVAs).

Cast
 Ken Kananji as Amadu
 Bertha Nkhoma as Asuwema
 Abdullah as John
 Kamlanje Fantasia Mkwamba as Abiti Daudi

References 

Malawian drama films
2019 films